Two White Arms, also known as Wives Beware, is a 1932 British comedy film directed by Fred Niblo and starring Adolphe Menjou, Margaret Bannerman and Claud Allister. It is adapted from a play by Harold Dearden.

Produced by Eric Hakim Productions and backed by MGM, the film was produced at Wembley Studios. It was Bannerman's first 'talkie'.

Premise
A man tires of married life and feigns the loss of his memory so he can pursue other women.

Cast
 Adolphe Menjou as Major Carey Liston
 Margaret Bannerman as Lydie Charrington
 Claud Allister as Doctor Biggash
 Jane Baxter as Alison Drury
 Kenneth Kove as Bob Russell
 Ellis Jeffreys as Lady Ellerslie
 René Ray as Trixie
 Jean Cadell as Mrs Drury
 Henry Wenman as Mears
 Spencer Trevor as Sir George
 Melville Cooper as Mack

Trivia
On 6 June 1933, Wives Beware was shown at the Camden Drive-In Theater in Pennsauken, New Jersey, making it the first film shown at a fully dedicated drive-in theater.

References

External links

1932 films
1932 comedy films
Films directed by Fred Niblo
British comedy films
Films shot at Wembley Studios
British black-and-white films
1930s English-language films
1930s British films